The Kalamazoo Wings, nicknamed the K-Wings, were a professional ice hockey team in Kalamazoo, Michigan. The team played in the International Hockey League from the 1974–75 season to the 1999–2000 season. The team played in Wings Stadium and was affiliated with the National Hockey League's Detroit Red Wings, Minnesota North Stars, and the Dallas Stars.

History
That team, which had named itself for its affiliation with the NHL Detroit Red Wings, changed its name during the 1995 playoffs to the Michigan K-Wings because the league wanted to raise its appeal for expanding to larger markets. The team's owner, the late R.T. Parfet, was the only small-market owner to oblige. However, concerns about larger-market teams entering the league, the league's instability, and the Dallas Stars ending their affiliation led to the Wings owners to request inactive status on April 17, 2000 and the team was dissolved. The IHL would fold a season later before the franchise could be resurrected.

The original team colors were red, white, and blue until the end of the 1987–88 season when the owners announced that they would change colors to green, gold, black, and white to match their new NHL affiliate, the Minnesota North Stars.

On July 27, 2000, the Madison Kodiaks of the United Hockey League announced that they were moving to Kalamazoo for the 2000–01 season, and would be known as the Kalamazoo Wings.

Championships

Standings

(*) - For 1987–1988 season Overtime Losses were tracked instead of Ties

Team records

Retired numbers
 #22 Mike Wanchuk
 #26 Kevin Schamehorn

Single season
Goals: 66  Dave Michayluk (1984–85)
Assists: 113  Rob Brown (1993–94)
Points: 155  Rob Brown (1993–94)
Penalty minutes: 648  Kevin Evans (1986–87)

Career
Career goals: 239  Mike Wanchuk and  Kevin Schamehorn
Career assists: 308  Brent Jarrett 
Career points: 475  Kevin Schamehorn
Career penalty minutes: 2,176  Kevin Evans

Career games played: 495  Kevin Schamehorn (1976–90)

References

External links
Kalamazoo Wings All-Time Roster
Michigan K-Wings All-Time Roster

International Hockey League (1945–2001) teams
Defunct ice hockey teams in the United States
Ice hockey clubs established in 1974
Sports clubs disestablished in 2000
Professional ice hockey teams in Michigan
Sports in Kalamazoo, Michigan
Philadelphia Flyers minor league affiliates
Detroit Red Wings minor league affiliates
Dallas Stars minor league affiliates
Minnesota North Stars minor league affiliates
1974 establishments in Michigan
2000 disestablishments in Michigan